Fissuria boui is a species of small freshwater snails with a gill and an operculum, aquatic gastropod molluscs in the family Hydrobiidae. This species is endemic to France.

References 

Hydrobiidae
Gastropods described in 1981
Endemic molluscs of Metropolitan France
Taxonomy articles created by Polbot